The 2007 Andorran local elections were held on 2 December. Voters elected the council members of the seven parishes.

Electoral system
Voters elect the members of the municipal councils (consells de comú in Catalan). The electoral law allows the municipal councils to choose their numbers of seats, which must be an even number between 10 and 16.

All city council members were elected in single multi-member districts, consisting of the whole parish, using closed lists. Half of the seats were allocated to the party with the most votes. The other half of the seats were allocated using the Hare quota (including the winning party). With this system the winning party obtained an absolute majority.

The cònsol major (mayor) and the cònsol menor (deputy mayor) were elected indirectly by the municipal councilors.

Results

Overall 

The Social Democratic Party contested this election under the nickname "The Alternative". They hold their 2 parishes. The liberals hold 4 councils and lost Ordino council to Ordino Communal Action.

Canillo

Encamp

Ordino

La Massana

Andorra la Vella

Sant Julià de Lòria

Escaldes-Engordany

References

External links
Election results (Government of Andorra)

2007
Andorra
2007 in Andorra
December 2007 events in Europe